Pater may refer to:

Latin for "father"
a title given to a father deity
 Dis Pater, a Roman and Celtic god of the underworld, later subsumed by Pluto or Jupiter
 God the Father in Christianity
a title or honorific applied to  a male community leader
a honorific for ordained Catholic priests
Pater familias
Pater Patriae
Pater, the leader of a Mithraeum in Mithraism

People with the surname
 Grzegorz Pater (born 1974), Polish soccer player 
 Jean-Baptiste Pater (1695–1736), French painter
 Walter Pater (1839–1893), English essayist, critic and humanist

Popular culture
 Pater (film), a 2011 French film
 Pater Moeskroen, Dutch Folkband
 Stade Pater Te Hono Nui, a stadium/sports complex in Pirae, Tahiti

Other uses
Pastil, a Filipino packed rice dish

See also
Pater noster
Patriarch
Patriarchy
Mater (disambiguation)